Perry River or River Perry may refer to:

Australia
 Perry River (Queensland), see rivers of Queensland
 Perry River (Victoria), Gippsland region, Victoria, Australia

Canada
 Perry River (Nunavut), Chester Bay, Nunavut
 Perry River (Eagle River tributary), British Columbia
 Perry River (Palmer River tributary), Les Appalaches Regional County Municipality, Chaudière-Appalaches, Quebec

United Kingdom
 River Perry, Shropshire, England

United States
 Perry Creek (Missouri River tributary), Iowa

See also
 Perry (disambiguation)